Ardencote Manor is a hotel and former manor house located 0.5 miles (0.8 km) north of the village of Claverdon, Warwickshire, England.

The manor was originally built in 1863 as a dowry house for Mary Phillips, the daughter of a Manchester based wool merchant Thomas. The property passed through several owners until it was purchased in 1980 by a consortium with the idea of turning it into a hotel and country club. After several defaulted attempts the current owner, a Mr Huckerby, took it over in 1996 and finally got the project off the ground.

At present the hotel has conference rooms, spa facilities, a swimming pool, tennis courts and an 18 hole golf course.

References

External links
 The Ardencote Manor Official site

Country houses in Warwickshire
Hotels in Warwickshire
Hotel spas
Golf clubs and courses in Warwickshire
Country house hotels